The 1921 Mecklenburg-Schwerin state election was held on 13 March 1921 to elect the 67 members of the Landtag of the Free State of Mecklenburg-Schwerin.

Results

References 

Mecklenburg-Schwerin
Elections in Mecklenburg-Western Pomerania